Gliwicki Klub Sportowy Piast Gliwice  is a Polish football club based in Gliwice. In the 2018–19 season, Piast won its first Polish championship. As of 2022–23, it competes in the Ekstraklasa, Poland's top division.

History

The club was founded in June 1945 by the Poles who had been forced to leave their homes in former eastern Poland annexed by the Soviet Union (present-day Ukraine). The club's name comes from the Piast dynasty, which ruled Poland from its beginnings as an independent state in the 10th century, until 1370, and in the city itself until 1532.

In 1949, five local teams were merged with Piast, and the team was renamed to Metal Piast Gliwice, and then to Stal Gliwice, before its original name Piast Gliwice was restored in 1955. Piast continued to play their matches on ul. Robotniczej. In 1964, Piast merged with GKS Gliwice, a team formed in 1956 from a fusion of the three other local clubs, and the name was changed to GKS Piast Gliwice. Since the 1950s, Piast mostly played in the Second Division. During that period, Piast have twice (1978, 1983) managed to reach the final of the Polish Cup, losing on both occasions.

In the 1990s, due to financial difficulties, the team was rebuilt from the Klasa B (7th tier), achieving four consecutive promotions from the seventh to the third tier in 1997–2001, and afterwards it won promotion to the II liga (second tier) in 2003. Piast played as many as 33 seasons in the Polish Second Division, before finally being promoted to the Ekstraklasa in 2008. Having played two seasons in the top division, the club was relegated in 2010 to come back in 2012. It is the first football team in Poland to gain promotion from the 7th tier to the Ekstraklasa (Polish top tier of football) and later to the European club competition.

In the 2010s, Piast enjoyed its greatest success, being runners-up in the 2015–16 Ekstraklasa and winning its first Polish Championship in the 2018–19 season.

There is also a futsal department of Piast Gliwice, which competes in the Futsal Ekstraklasa (top division). Its home venue is the Gliwice Arena. It won its first Polish Championship in the 2021–22 season.

Naming history
(18.06.1945) – KS Piast Gliwice
(23.05.1946) – KSM Piast Gliwice
(September/November 1947) – ZKSM Piast Gliwice
(05.03.1949) – ZS Metal Piast Gliwice (merged with ZKSM Huta Łabędy, ZKS Walcownia Łabędy, RKS Jedność Rudziniec, *RKS PZS Gliwice and ZKS Silesia Gliwice)
(01.11.1949) – ZKS Stal Gliwice
(11.03.1951) – ZKS Stal GZUT Gliwice
(15.03.1955) – ZKS Piast Gliwice
(20.01.1957) – KS Piast Gliwice
(01.01.1961) – SKS Piast Gliwice
(15.03.1964) – GKS Piast Gliwice (merged with GKS Gliwice and KS Metal Gliwice)
(17.10.1983) – MC-W GKS Piast Gliwice
(12.09.1989) – CWKS Piast-Bumar Gliwice
(1989) – [merged with ZTS Łabędy (Gliwice)]
(1990) – CWKS Bumar-Piast Gliwice
(04.04.1990) – KS Bumar Gliwice
(11.05.1990) – KS Bumar Łabędy (Gliwice)
(01.07.1990) – KS Bumar Gliwice
(1991) – KS Piast-Bumar Gliwice
(01.07.1992) – MC-W GKS Piast Gliwice
(01.08.1995) – KS Bojków Gliwice (merged with KS Bojków Gliwice)
(15.09.1995) – KS Piast Bojków Gliwice
(02.09.1996) – GKS Piast Gliwice

Crest

The club's crest is derived from the coat of arms of the city of Gliwice, and thus contains the Piast Eagle of the Upper Silesian line of the medieval Polish Piast dynasty, which ruled the city until 1532.

Honours 
Ekstraklasa
Champions: 2018–19 
Runners-up: 2015–16
3rd place: 2019–20
I Liga (Second Division)
Champions: 2011–12
Polish Cup
Runners-up: 1978, 1983

Seasons 
Seasons in Ekstraklasa: 12 (2008–10, 2012–)
Seasons in I liga: 35
Seasons in II liga: 16
Seasons in III liga: 23

European record

Results

Notes
 1Q: First qualifying round
 2Q: Second qualifying round
 3Q: Third qualifying round

UEFA Team ranking

<small>'As of 30 September 2021.</small>

Stadium

Piast plays their home games at the 10,000 capacity Stadion Miejski im. Piotra Wieczorka in Gliwice.

Supporters
Piast have a friendship with fans of Belarusian club BATE Borisov since 2011. The friendship started when BATE fans on their way to a Champions League match in Copenhagen stopped for a Piast game against local rivals GKS Katowice. The Piast fans then went to Alkmaar to support BATE versus AZ. After another visit for a Champions League game against Sturm Graz, the friendship became official and both sets of fans regularly visit each other.

Piast's major rivals are Górnik Zabrze, with whom they contest the local derby. The stadiums are located just a few kilometres from each other. Other rivals are local teams Ruch Chorzów, GKS Katowice and the two Bytom clubs, Szombierki and Polonia.

Current squad

Out on loan

Former players

Europe

Bosnia and Herzegovina

  Stojan Vranješ

Czech Republic

  Michal Papadopulos
  Lumír Sedláček 
 
Denmark

  Mikkel Kirkeskov

Estonia

  Konstantin Vassiljev

Hungary

  Kristopher Vida

Lithuania

  Edvinas Girdvainis

Poland

  Daniel Ciechański
  Patryk Lipski 
  Piotr Parzyszek 
  Sebastian Milewski 
  Kamil Glik 
  Martin Konczkowski
  Bartosz Rymaniak 
  Piotr Malarczyk 
  Dominik Steczyk 
  Tomasz Jodłowiec 
  Michał Żyro 
  Tymoteusz Klupś 
  Patryk Sokołowski 
  Jakub Świerczok 
  Patryk Tuszyński

Portugal

  Tiago Alves

Serbia

  Aleksandar Sedlar

Slovenia

  Uroš Korun

Spain

  Gerard Badía

Ukraine

  Denys Arendaruk

South America

Brazil

  Hebert Silva Santos

Ecuador

  Joel Valencia

Managers
 Krzysztof Zagórski (16 December 2001 – 23 October 2002)
 Józef Dankowski (21 April 2003 – 19 October 2004)
 Wojciech Borecki (19 October 2004 – 31 December 2004)
 Jacek Zielinski (31 December 2004 – 14 September 2006)
 Jan Furlepa (interim)'' (14–20 September 2006)
 Boguslaw Pietrzak (20 September 2006 – 30 June 2007)
 Piotr Mandrysz (3 July 2007 – 30 June 2008)
 Marek Wlecialowski (1 July 2008 – 5 January 2009)
 Dariusz Fornalak (5 January 2009 – 15 March 2010)
 Ryszard Wieczorek (15 March 2010 – 31 May 2010)
 Marcin Brosz (15 June 2010 – 6 May 2014)
 Ángel García (7 May 2014 – 18 March 2015)
 Radoslav Látal (20 March 2015 – 15 July 2016)
 Jiří Neček (15 July 2016 – 30 August 2016)
 Radoslav Látal (1 September 2016 – 2 March 2017)
 Dariusz Wdowczyk (3 March 2017 – 19 September 2017)
 Waldemar Fornalik (19 September 2017 – 25 October 2022)

Notes

See also
 Football in Poland

References

External links
 
 Piast Gliwice at 90minut.pl

Sport in Gliwice
Football clubs in Silesian Voivodeship
Association football clubs established in 1945
1945 establishments in Poland